Dorp is a South African rock band based in London, England.

History

Formation
The band was formed in 1992, under its previous name, The Fauves, by Myburgh Grobbelaar (vocals), Albert Loubser (guitar), Dylan Kemlo (bass guitar), Timothy Rankin (drums) and David Poole (saxophone) in Somerset West at Parel Vallei High School.

In 1995 guitarist Albert Loubser (later known as Albert Frost) left the band to join the Blues Broers and was replaced by Alan Bainbridge. The band then changed its name to Dorp, the current name. Shortly thereafter, vocalist Myburgh Grobbelaar left to pursue a solo career and was replaced by Pieter Bezuidenhout, the current frontman.

In 1996, Dorp released its first album, Indigenous Jewellery, independently, on a label set up by Bezuidenhout, Oom Gert Records. The album had limited distribution and is now out of print. The band changed guitarists once more; Alan Bainbridge left and was replaced by current guitarist Kevin Kieswetter.

The band recorded its second release, a 5-track EP called Five Steps Off The Pacemaker in 1997 on Wildebeest Records, which had a wider distribution. The band released its third disc in 1998, Danger Gevaar Ingozi.

Relocation, 1999
In 1999 the band decided to relocate to London to try to break international radio. Shortly after arriving, the bassist, drummer and saxophonist returned to South Africa, leaving only singer Piet and guitarist Kevin. They resorted to busking in Covent Garden to pay for food and accommodation. It was not long before they attracted the attention of a Frenchman, Fred Caïou (later known as Fred KU). They gigged for a while, experimenting with different sounds including "drill ’n’ bass disco". The three-piece recorded an EP, called Boy/Girl, the title track being the first song Piet wrote after the relocation.

The band released its 3rd full-length album in 2002 called "Tap into The System" on their own label, Contains Nuts Records. This clever, quirky collection of eleven songs showcased dorp as a three-piece (Piet, Kevin & Fred) and worked brilliantly as a recording. However, a Producer friend mentioned that having a drummer for the live shows would work even better and having met Rob Driver at a typically bonkers Dorp party, they asked him to join. Rob, a seasoned drummer and multi-instrumentalist had worked on numerous London-based projects leading up to Dorp including a stint playing "Roger Taylor" in "Closet Queen", a tribute band managed by Ricky Gervais in the early/mid-90s.

Already making waves and eccentric new sounds, the arrival of Rob Driver set the Dorp project spectacularly on its way, with four global influences crashing together to forge a virgin sound. Rob Driver's UK rock influences and Fred KU's love of techno made something even wilder when combined with Piet and Kevin's unique perspective.

"Humans Being", 2002–2008
The revitalised four-piece Dorp were approached by an Artist Management pairing, Jason Still and Mark Titcombe who provided timely contacts within the music industry helping Dorp with gigging opportunities outside London, embarking on UK-wide tours and four South African tours.

To encapsulate Dorp's energetic new sound, top-flight Producer, Dan Swift, (Kasabian, Depeche Mode, Snow Patrol) was enlisted and helped shape "London Out There". Rudi Louw filmed the video in London's West-End which included a cameo performance by actor Alan Ford (Brick Top in Snatch).

Dan Swift was unavailable for future recordings so Dave McCracken (Ian Brown, Boy George, Florence and the Machine) produced the album in Flood's West London Studio (Nick Cave, Nine Inch Nails, PJ Harvey). Additional production was provided by Max Heyes (Doves, Paul Weller, Jamiroquai) on the track "Stand Out" to complete the 13-track album entitled "Humans Being".

Dorp toured with the likes of Groove Armada and The Violent Femmes, achieving two Number One's in South Africa ("London Out There" and "Rollercoaster").

Due to financial pressures Dorp sadly disbanded at the end of 2008.

Band members

Current
 Piet Bez – lead vocals, rhythm guitar (1996–present)
 Kevin Floyd – lead guitar, backing vocals, bass guitar, keyboard (1997–present)
 Fred KU – DJ, Decks, synthesizer (1999–present)
 Rick Walsh – drums (2008–present)

Former
 Rob Driver – drums, keyboards, backing vocals (2000–2008) 
 Myburgh Grobbelaar – vocals (1992–1995)
 Albert Frost – guitar (1992–1995)
 David Poole – saxophone, clarinet, pennywhistle, backing vocals (1992–1999)
 Dylan Kemlo – bass guitar, whistle (1992–1999)
 Timothy Rankin – drums, percussion (1992–1999)
 Alan Bainbridge – drums, backing vocals (co-founder, 1995–1997)
 Derrek Gripper – viola (1998)
 Douglas Armstrong – trumpet (1998)
 DJ Shane – DJ, scratches (1998)

Discography

Studio albums

Singles

External links

Official Sites
 Dorp's official website
 Dorp's official MySpace
 Dorp's Youtube Channel
 Dorp on Rock.co.za
 Dorp – London Out There Review on Daily Music Guide

South African alternative rock groups